Zaza Chelidze (born 12 January 1987) is a Georgian professional football player.

External links

Profile at Torpedo Kutaisi website

1987 births
Living people
Footballers from Georgia (country)
Association football defenders
Expatriate footballers from Georgia (country)
Expatriate footballers in Belarus
FC Dila Gori players
FC Sioni Bolnisi players
FC Dinamo Batumi players
FC Metalurgi Rustavi players
FC Dynamo Brest players
FC Torpedo Kutaisi players
FC Zestafoni players
FC Gomel players
FC Dinamo Tbilisi players
FC Chikhura Sachkhere players